József Varga may refer to:
József Varga (footballer, born 1954), Hungarian footballer
József Varga (footballer, born 1988), Hungarian footballer
József Varga (footballer, born 1999), Hungarian footballer
József Varga (politician, born 1962), Hungarian politician (Fidesz)
József Varga (Vojvodina politician) (born 1959), politician in Serbia from the country's Hungarian community

See also
 József